Joseph John (1906–1998) was a minister of the Church of South India, who founded a Rural Life Center in the former Madras state in India to help poor and casteless people. He died in 1998 at the age of 92 years.

Biography 
Joseph John was ordained in 1934 and served as a young pastor in the Serkadu area of Katpadi in Vellore District, Tamil Nadu, India. He encountered Mahatma Gandhi who called upon the young pastor, as a Christian, to start a venture as a memorial to the Anglican priest, C.F. Andrews, known as Deena bandu, "friend of the poor", one of Gandhi's closest followers. Joseph John was inspired and left the ministry in 1948 to serve the poor and casteless in a remote area in the former Madras state without outside support. He believed in people's ability to help themselves if someone gave them initial support. Joseph John acquired 500 hectares of land in Palasamudram Mandal in Chittoor District of Andhra Pradesh State, and called the location Deenabandupuram (place of the friend of the poor), as there were several locations of the same tenor created in India. Like Gandhi, Joseph John always wore clothes of khadi made in India.

The land was considered uncultivable. He wanted to show the farmers that a better life was possible. John moved there with his first wife Ranji (Aaron) John, a graduate from Union Missionary Medical School in Vellore.

Work 
Joseph John's Deenabanduparum Rural Life Center is located in a valley known as the “Home of the Friends of the Poor”. He settled landless people on empty land provided by the Indian government. 
Since 1955 his ideas were supported by the organization World Neighbors.
Money was not given to people but borrowed by them from a revolving loan fund. Those who were helped, repaid their loans. Not only were they establishing their self-respect but they knew that their repayments would help others.

Joseph John's two sons, graduates of the Christian Medical College Vellore, contributed new dimensions to his work in the Deenabanduparum Rural Life Center.

Karuna John graduated with a degree in agriculture in California. He directed the center's agricultural extension program, urging local farmers to use irrigation, fertilizers, better seeds and a variety of crops. With the support of World Neighbors, villagers were trained in skills like carpentry, metalwork and printing.

Dr. Prem Chandran John and his wife Dr. Hari John (Ari Kumari Paliah) – both physicians – directed the medical phase of the center, offering low-cost medical care and an extensive family planning program for villages within a 30-mile radius of the center. Joseph John and his family were involved in establishing a comprehensive community health project emphasizing sanitation, nutrition, increased food production and family planning. In 1975 their clinic had 25 beds and some mobile units.

In addition, Dr. Prem Chandran John held a Master of Science degree in public health from Johns Hopkins University in Baltimore, Maryland, with a specialization in leprosy. The John family created the Nava Jeevan (New Life) project for lepers to bring them back into society as contributing, productive members. Rotary International provided essential manpower to accomplish the much-needed total public health survey of the area for this leprosy project. Through the Nava Jeevan (New Life) project, lepers from Madras were resettled in rural areas. These families lived in houses provided by the Rural Life Center, which also provided them with seed and water for farming during their medical treatment. This program for people with leprosy thus enabled the affected people to earn their own living.

From 1965 to 1973 Joseph John engaged in an irrigation agricultural project of the Tamilnadu Christian Council for small farmers in Tamilnadu with the support of Lüder Lüers and Bread for the World of the German Protestant church.

Churches and worship services in indigenous India style 
Since 1956 Joseph John's endeavor in his missionary strive was to relate the order of Christian worship to the Indian culture. Likewise he was a pioneer in seeking an indigenous architectural style for building new churches. A notable feature of his style is the baptismal font shaped in the form of a lotus flower, with a cross planted in its midst.

All the church buildings which Joseph John was responsible for, are designed in the form of a pillared temple hall (mandapa), which are built from stone, with motifs carved on them which usually combine Hindu and Christian symbols or Indo-Saracenic architecture style (a combination of Hindu and Muslim styles). 
He was responsible for commissioning and building a number of churches. In association with two of the buildings he also began local festivals, like on Zion Hills west of Vellore.

References

External links 
 Hope College. Hope College Digital Commons. 1954. 122nd Annual Report of the Board of World Missions. Reformed Church in America. Page 17.: Film entitled "Village of the Poor", made by Alan Shilin Productions for interdenominational use. The locale is Deenabandupuram in the Arcot area, the scene of the labors of the Rev. and Mrs. Joseph John. Retrieved 3 May 2022
 Drs. Hari and Prem Chandran John: We Learn Through Our Failures: the Evolution of a Community Based Programme in Deenabandhu. World Council of Churches. In: CONTACT 82, Christian Medical Commission, Geneva, December 1984. Retrieved 27 March 2022
 Hari and Prem Chandran John: We Learn Through Our Failure: the Evolution of a Community-Based. Programme in Deenabandhu. Society for Community Health Awareness Research and Action. In: CONTACT 82, Christian Medical Commission, Geneva, December 1984. Retrieved 27 March 2022
 Robert A. Bassi: World Neighbours. In: The Rotarian. An International Magazine December/ 1975, p. 24-27. Retrieved 27 March 2022
 Dmitri Kessel. Living by the plow and the prayer. In: A lesson in Unity. Five different faiths merge in South India. Life, Vol. 39. Nr. 26-Vol. 40. No.1. December 26, 1955, p. 148ff Retrieved 1 May 2022
 Reverend Joseph John, Deenabandupuram Retrieved 1 May 2022
 Down memory lane. THE TAMILNAD CHRISTIAN COUNCIL ECONOMIC LIFE COMMITTEE. Backdrop. Retrieved 27 March 2022
 John L. Peter: Finding Local Leadership. In: Cry Dignity! 2007, p. 44 -47 Retrieved 27 March 2022
 Fridolin Trüb: Auf den Spuren Gandhis in Indien. In: Dem Frieden entgegen. 2009, S. 30 Retrieved 27 March 2022

1906 births
1998 deaths
Indian Christian clergy
Church of South India
Christian clergy from Andhra Pradesh